The Hell–Volhard–Zelinsky halogenation reaction is a chemical transformation that involves the halogenation of a carboxylic acid at the α carbon. For this reaction to occur the  α carbon must bear at least one proton. The reaction is named after the German chemists Carl Magnus von Hell (1849–1926) and Jacob Volhard (1834–1910) and the Russian chemist Nikolay Zelinsky (1861–1953).

An example of the Hell–Volhard–Zelinsky reaction can be seen in the preparation of alanine from propionic acid.  In the first step, a combination of bromine and phosphorus tribromide (catalyst) is used in the Hell–Volhard–Zelinsky reaction to prepare 2-bromopropanoic acid, which in the second step is converted to a racemic mixture of the amino acid product by ammonolysis.

Mechanism 
The reaction is initiated by addition of a catalytic amount of PBr3, after which one molar equivalent of Br2 is added.

PBr3 replaces the carboxylic OH with a bromide, resulting in a carboxylic acid bromide. The acyl bromide tautomerizes to an enol, which reacts with the Br2 to brominate at the α position.

In neutral to slightly acidic aqueous solution, hydrolysis of the α-bromo acyl bromide occurs spontaneously, yielding the α-bromo carboxylic acid in an example of a nucleophilic acyl substitution.  If an aqueous solution is desirable, a full molar equivalent of PBr3 must be used as the catalytic chain is disrupted.

If little nucleophilic solvent is present, reaction of the α-bromo acyl bromide with the carboxylic acid yields the α-bromo carboxylic acid and regenerates the acyl bromide intermediate. In practice a molar equivalent of PBr3 is often used anyway to overcome the slow reaction kinetics.

The mechanism for the exchange between an alkanoyl bromide and a carboxylic acid is below.
The α-bromoalkanoyl bromide has a strongly electrophilic carbonyl carbon because of the electron-withdrawing effects of the two bromides.

By quenching the reaction with an alcohol, instead of water, the α-bromo ester can be obtained.

See also 
Reformatsky reaction

References 

Halogenation reactions
Substitution reactions
Name reactions